The 2014–15 Melbourne Renegades season is the fourth in the club's history. Coached by Simon Helmot and captained by Aaron Finch, they are competed in the 
BBL's 2014–15 season.

Summary
Similarly to the previous season, the Renegades headed into the 2014–15 Big Bash League season with confidence after signing Matthew Wade and Callum Ferguson in the pre-season, but failed to qualify for the finals yet again, finishing 6th. The poor run from the previous season resulted in the coach Simon Helmot being sacked.

Squad

Fixtures

Pre-season

Regular season

Ladder

Ladder progress

Season statistics

Home attendance

References

External links
 Official website of the Melbourne Renegades
 Official website of the Big Bash League

Melbourne Renegades seasons